The World Group Play-offs were four ties which involved the losing nations of the World Group first round and the winning nations of the World Group II. Nations that won their play-off ties entered the 2011 World Group, while losing nations joined the 2011 World Group II.

Belgium vs. Estonia

Ukraine vs. Australia

Germany vs. France

Serbia vs. Slovakia

Note: Ana Ivanovic decided to withdraw from this tie in March due to her ongoing poor form.

References

See also
Fed Cup structure

World Group Play-offs